Viorica Neculai (later Ilica, born 3 July 1967) is a retired Romanian rower. Competing in eights she won a silver medal at the 1992 Olympics and gold medals at the 1989 and 1993 world championships.

She should not be confused with Veronica Necula and Viorica Ioja, fellow rowers who competed in the same events in the same period.

References

1967 births
Living people
Romanian female rowers
Rowers at the 1988 Summer Olympics
Rowers at the 1992 Summer Olympics
Olympic silver medalists for Romania
Olympic rowers of Romania
Olympic medalists in rowing
Medalists at the 1992 Summer Olympics
World Rowing Championships medalists for Romania